Maleskam (also Romanized as Maleskām and Moleskām; also known as Mowlīskān) is a village in Gurab Pas Rural District, in the Central District of Fuman County, Gilan Province, Iran. At the 2006 census, its population was 816, in 207 families.

References 

Populated places in Fuman County